Mexico is an unincorporated community, in Allegany County, Maryland, United States. It lies at an elevation of 604 feet (184 m).

References

Unincorporated communities in Maryland
Unincorporated communities in Allegany County, Maryland